Deep Motif is the sixth studio album by Azalia Snail, released in 1996 by Candy Floss.

Track listing

Personnel 
Adapted from Deep Motif liner notes.
 Azalia Snail – vocals, guitar, production

Release history

References

External links 
 

1996 albums
Azalia Snail albums